This page is one of a series of pages that list New Hampshire historical markers. The text of each installed marker is provided within its entry. Although there are fewer than 300 markers, the name of this page allows for future expansion.


Markers 276 to 300

Markers 276–279 appeared in the state's June 2022 listing, although not yet installed. They were then removed from subsequent listings. Markers 277 and 279 have since been installed and re-added to the state's listing.

. The Grave by the Lake
Town of Tuftonboro

Not yet installed

. Cold War-era Bomber Crash
Town of Fremont

Location: NH 107 south of Copp Drive

“On the morning of Aug. 10, 1959, during routine training exercises, a B-52 Stratofortress military plane crashed into nearby Spruce Swamp. During the flight, the plane’s mechanicals failed, and the pilot ordered all seven crewmembers on board to parachute to safety over Candia. The pilot ejected over Fremont 20 seconds before the plane exploded in mid-air and crashed, burning several acres on impact: later, the U.S. Air Force closed off and cleaned up the site. It was the first time in U.S. history that a B-52 crashed without fatalities.”

. Elizabeth Gurley Flynn "The Rebel Girl"
City of Concord

Not yet installed

. The Balch Household Graves
Town of Barrington

Location:: NH 9 next to Pine Grove Cemetery

“The reinterred graves of two members of the Balch Household are in Pine Grove Cemetery. Rev. Benjamin Balch (1743-1815) was the first chaplain of the Continental Navy and earned the title of ‘Fighting Parson,’ then served as the pastor of the local Congregational Church. Buried next to him is Aggie (ca. 1740-ca. 1840), an African American woman who was enslaved as a child and who lived out her life in Barrington after her emancipation. Known for nursing the town's sick during a severe epidemic, she also worked as domestic help in the Balch household, most likely between 1784-1815.”

Notes

References

External links
New Hampshire Historical Highway Markers - New Hampshire Division of Historical Resources

New Hampshire historical markers